Askari Mian Irani (1940 – 2004) was a Pakistani painter.

Early life and education
In 1967, Askari Mian Irani received a diploma in Commercial Design from the Mayo School of Arts now called National College of Arts (NCA), Lahore.

Career
He worked in the business of advertising until 1976, but later became disillusioned with the nature of his job. So he decided to come back to his first love and passion - painting.
Askari Mian Irani was part of the faculty of the National College of Arts (NCA) from 1976 to 1999.

Painting exhibits
He exhibited in over 20 solo and group shows.

Stamp design
Irani designed two stamps (40 paisas and 85 paisas) of the Third Organisation of the Islamic Conference (OIC) (1981) issue.

Commemorative postage stamp
On 14 August 2006, Pakistan Post issued a Rs. 40 sheetlet of stamps to posthumously honour 10 Pakistani painters. Besides Askari Mian Irani, the other nine painters were: Laila Shahzada, Zubeida Agha, Sadequain, Ali Imam, Shakir Ali, Anna Molka Ahmed, Zahoor ul Akhlaq, Ahmed Pervez and Bashir Mirza.

Awards and recognition
 Pride of Performance Award by the President of Pakistan (2002)

References

External links
Ten Great Painters Stamps by Pakistan Post

1940 births
2004 deaths
Pakistani stamp designers
National College of Arts alumni
20th-century Pakistani painters
Recipients of the Pride of Performance
Pakistani calligraphers
Pakistani Shia Muslims